This is a list of people who have served as Lord-Lieutenant of County Cork.

There were lieutenants of counties in Ireland until the reign of James II, when they were renamed governors. The office of Lord Lieutenant was recreated on 23 August 1831, and is pronounced in the usual British fashion as 'Lord Lef-tenant'.

Governors

 Charles Wilmot, 1st Viscount Wilmot 1601-  (died 1644)
 Robert Phayre 1651–54
 Francis Boyle, 1st Viscount Shannon 1686–1689
 Charles Boyle, 2nd Earl of Burlington 1690– (died 1704)
 Henry Boyle, 1st Earl of Shannon 1756– (died 1764)
 Richard Longfield, 1st Viscount Longueville 1758–1761
 Richard Boyle, 2nd Earl of Shannon 1786– (died 1807)
 Robert King, 2nd Earl of Kingston 1789 (died 1799)
 Robert Uniacke Fitzgerald 1805–1814
 Hayes St Leger, 2nd Viscount Doneraile: 1809–1819
 William Tonson, 2nd Baron Riversdale: 1820–1831
 William O'Brien, 2nd Marquess of Thomond: –1831
 Hayes St Leger, 3rd Viscount Doneraile: –1831
 George King, 3rd Earl of Kingston: –1831
 William Hodder: –1831

Lord Lieutenants
The 3rd Earl of Shannon: 7 October 1831 – 22 April 1842
The 2nd Earl of Bandon: 1842 – 31 October 1856
The 1st Baron Fermoy: 4 December 1856 – 17 September 1874 
The 3rd Earl of Bandon: 10 November 1874 – 17 February 1877
The 4th Earl of Bandon: 13 June 1877 – 1922

References

Cork